Regional League North-East Division is the 3rd Level League in Thailand. It was formed in 2009 along with other four other regional leagues, all playing at the same level. The winner of each regional league enter the Regional League Championships to determine the three teams that will receive promotion to the Thai Division 1 League.

League history

Formed in 2009, initially 12 clubs applied to be part of the new setup; Songkhla United, Chaiyaphum United, Loei City, Mahasarakham, Mukdahan-Savannakhet, Nakhon Phanom, Nakhon Ratchasima, Roi Et, Sakon Nakhon, Surin, Udon Thani and Ubon United.

Nakhon Ratchasima and Sakon Nakhon were the only two teams with previous experience in the Thai football league system.

Loei City won the first ever championship and took the Regional League championship allocation, winning the division on the final day of the season.

After round 16 and with only 6 more matchdays to go, Ubon United withdrew from the league and were subsequently banned by FAT for two years due to a dispute with the football federation over standards set off the field of play. This in itself caused confusion within the division itself, as initially 2-0 results were awarded to the opposition, but in the final week of the season it was announced by the football federation that all results would be declared null and void, thus a new league table being drawn up for the final game.

Timeline

Championship history

Member clubs

 
Nor
Sports leagues established in 2009
2009 establishments in Thailand